Dorothy Mary Owen, née Williamson (11 April 1920 – 13 February 2002) was an English archivist and historian.

Life
Born in Hyde, Cheshire and educated at Manchester University, Dorothy Williamson undertook postgraduate study there under C. R. Cheney, writing her dissertation on the legation of Cardinal Otto of Tonengo in the British Isles, 1237–1241.

From 1948 to 1958 she was Assistant Archivist at the Lincolnshire Archives. In 1958 she married Arthur Owen, a fellow archivist and historian, and moved to London to be archivist at Lambeth Palace Library. In 1960 the pair moved to Cambridge, where Arthur had been appointed to a job at Cambridge University Library. Dorothy was soon instructing students in palaeography and diplomatic, and working on the diocesan records of Ely, recently deposited in the University Library. She was formally appointed Custodian of Ecclesiastical Archives in 1968 and Keeper of the University Archives in 1978. In 1969 she was elected a Fellow of Wolfson College. She was active in the British Records Association, and served as Chairman of its Records Preservation Section, 1966–71; Chairman of Council, 1974–8; and Vice-President, 1981–91.

In 1995 she was appointed MBE. She died in Thimbleby, Lincolnshire.

Works

 The Library and Muniments of Ely Cathedral. Ely: Dean and Chapter of Ely, 1973.
(ed.) 

(ed.)

References

External links

1920 births
2002 deaths
English archivists
Female archivists
Fellows of Wolfson College, Cambridge
Members of the Order of the British Empire
20th-century English historians
British medievalists
Women medievalists
British women historians
20th-century British women writers